Naranpura is one of the 182 Legislative Assembly constituencies of Gujarat state in India. It is part of Ahmedabad district. This seat came into existence after 2008 delimitation and it is one of the seven assembly seats which make up Gandhinagar Lok Sabha constituency.

List of segments
This assembly seat represents the following segments,

 Ahmedabad City Taluka (Part) – Ahmedabad Municipal Corporation (Part) Ward No. – 11, 12, 13, 14.

Members of Legislative Assembly

Election results

2022

2017

2012

See also
 List of constituencies of the Gujarat Legislative Assembly
 Ahmedabad district
 Sarkhej Assembly constituency

References

External links
 

Assembly constituencies of Gujarat
Ahmedabad district